Blastobasis indirecta is a moth in the family Blastobasidae. It was described by Edward Meyrick in 1935. It is found in Taiwan.

References

Blastobasis
Moths described in 1935